Murashi is a rural locality (a village) in Kultayevskoye Rural Settlement, Permsky District, Perm Krai, Russia. The population was 68 as of 2010. There are 7 streets.

Geography 
Murashi is located 28 km southwest of Perm (the district's administrative centre) by road. Nizhniye Mully is the nearest rural locality.

References 

Rural localities in Permsky District